The Belfast Free Library is a public library in Belfast, Maine. The library was established in 1887 by act of the Maine Legislature following donations from Paul Hazeltine and Nathanial Wilson.

References

Buildings and structures in Belfast, Maine
Libraries in Waldo County, Maine